Ramón Alberto Webster (born August 31, 1942) is a Panamanian former professional baseball first baseman. He played in Major League Baseball for the Kansas City / Oakland Athletics, San Diego Padres, and Chicago Cubs.

Webster came on strong in his rookie season for the Athletics, and handily won the starting first base job over Ken Harrelson after hit .256 with 11 home runs and 51 RBI in 360 at-bats. Since the 1968 Opening Day, Webster batted cleanup in the order behind Bert Campaneris, Reggie Jackson and Sal Bando. Unfortunately, a leg injury suffered in early May limited his playing time for the rest of the season, dropping off to .214 with three homers and 23 RBI in 66 games, and never recovered his previous form. Eventually, he finished his career as a left-handed pinch-hitter producing unsatisfactory results.
 
In a five-season career, Webster was a .244 hitter (190-for-778) with 17 home runs and 98 RBI in 380 games, including 76 runs, 31 doubles, six triples, and nine stolen bases.

See also
Players from Panama in Major League Baseball

External links

Retrosheet
Venezuelan Professional Baseball League

1942 births
Living people
Boston Red Sox scouts
Cardenales de Lara players
Chicago Cubs players
Daytona Beach Islanders players
Florida Instructional League Athletics players
Iowa Oaks players
Kansas City Athletics players
Leones del Caracas players
Panamanian expatriate baseball players in Venezuela
Lewiston Broncs players
Major League Baseball first basemen
Major League Baseball players from Panama
Oakland Athletics players
Panama Banqueros players
Sportspeople from Colón, Panama
San Diego Padres players
Saraperos de Saltillo players
Tiburones de La Guaira players
Toronto Blue Jays scouts
Tucson Toros players
Vancouver Mounties players
Panamanian expatriate baseball players in Canada